Visitors to Azerbaijan must obtain a visa from one of the Azerbaijani diplomatic missions unless they come from one of the visa-exempt countries, countries eligible for visas on arrival or countries eligible for electronic visas. Visitors must hold passports that are valid for at least 3 months beyond the intended period of stay.

Visa policy map

General visa requirements

The applicant's passport must be valid for at least 3 months longer than the expected validity period of the visa applied for. If there are less than 3 months left on the applicant's passport before expiry, a visa will not be granted. Citizens of specific countries listed, who are required to obtain a visa with an ordinary passport or with a service passport, have to obtain a visa before travelling to Azerbaijan. Visas are issued at an embassy or consulate of the Republic of Azerbaijan or upon arrival at the border crossing points of the Republic of Azerbaijan.
The visa application form may be filled online and submitted to the diplomatic mission.

Visa exemption
Citizens of the following 11(+1) countries can visit Azerbaijan without a visa for up to 90 days:

Azerbaijan and  have agreed to mutual visa waivers on February 1, 2022.

But according to the foreign ministries of both countries, it is still unclear whether Serbian citizens are entering Azerbaijan without a visa.

Non-ordinary passports

Additionally holders of diplomatic or service category passports of Albania, Argentina, Austria, Bolivia, Bosnia and Herzegovina, Brazil, Bulgaria, China, Colombia, Cuba, Egypt, Hungary, India, Indonesia, Iran, Iraq, Israel, Italy, Jordan, Kuwait, Latvia, Libya (temporary not applied), Lithuania, Mongolia, Montenegro, Morocco, Pakistan, Peru, Portugal, Qatar, Romania, San Marino, Serbia, Slovakia, Slovenia, South Korea, Switzerland, Syria, Turkey, Turkmenistan, United Arab Emirates, Uruguay, Venezuela, Vietnam and only holders of diplomatic passports of Belgium, Croatia, Cyprus, Czech Republic, Estonia, Finland, France, Germany, Greece, Japan, Laos, Lichtenstein, Luxembourg, Malta, Mexico, Netherlands, Norway, Palestine, Poland, Spain and Sweden do not require a visa to visit Azerbaijan.

Visa waiver agreements have already been signed with the following countries but are not yet ratified or applied:

 – in September 2018 for holders of diplomatic and service passports
 – on 24 March 2019 for holders of diplomatic and service passports

Visa on arrival
Citizens of the following 13 countries can obtain a visa on arrival in Azerbaijan, valid for a maximum stay of 30 days. The visa is obtainable at any international airport.

Conditional visa on arrival

Citizens of the  can obtain a visa on arrival (valid for 30 days) in Azerbaijan, only if arriving on a direct flight of Azerbaijan Airlines from New York City.

Visa on arrival for holders of an official invitation letter issued by the State Migration Service of Azerbaijan or other Azerbaijan government authority.
Visa on arrival for staff of the Asian Development Bank (ADB) and their dependents, provided holding an official invitation letter issued by the Asian Development Bank (ADB).

Starting from 26 July 2018 passengers with a residence permit issued by United Arab Emirates can obtain a tourist visa upon arrival in Azerbaijan.

The cost for the visa on arrival is $30 US Dollars except for Japanese passport holders (Free).

Electronic visa
Azerbaijan introduced electronic visas for citizens of designated countries in January 2017. The system is called ASAN Visa and visas are issued for a single-entry visit up to 30 days. The e-visa should be printed and presented together with the passport (that should be valid at least 3 months more than the validity period of the electronic visa) at the border checkpoint. The e-Visa is issued within 3 working days.

The designated 78 countries or jurisdictions eligible to use the ASAN Visa system are the following:

As of February 2017, ASAN was looking into the possibility of making the electronic visa application available directly at the ports of entry at the border with Georgia, Russia, Turkey, and Iran.

British travel magazine Wanderlust rated the Azerbaijan e-visa system (ASAN Visa) as the easiest visa to get in the world in 2017.

There are plans to expand the ASAN Visa system for the issuance of visas to citizens of Azerbaijan as well. As of January 2018 Morocco was selected and negotiations were under way with Lithuania and United Arab Emirates.

From 15 May 2018 citizens of Bahrain, China, Indonesia, Iran, Israel, Japan, Kuwait, Malaysia, Oman, Qatar, Saudi Arabia, Singapore, South Korea, United Arab Emirates
 can obtain an electronic visa on arrival in Baku International Airport.

Visa facilitation

COVID-19 restrictions
During the COVID-19 pandemic, the issuance of electronic visas and visas on arrival was suspended.

Armenia
There have been exceptions, most notably for Armenia's participation at the 2015 European Games held in Baku.

The government of Azerbaijan strictly bans the entry and transit to any visit of foreign citizens to the separatist region of Nagorno-Karabakh (the de facto Republic of Artsakh) and the Azerbaijani exclaves of Karki, Yuxarı Əskipara, Barxudarlı and Sofulu which are de jure part of Azerbaijan but under control of Armenia, without prior consent of the Government of Azerbaijan. Foreign citizens who enter these territories without permission are subject to being refused entry and transit to Azerbaijan and being included into the "list of persona non grata". The same policy applied to the Armenian-occupied territories surrounding Nagorno-Karabakh until they returned to Azerbaijani control as a result of the 2020 Nagorno-Karabakh war.

Visitor statistics

By country

See also

Electronic visa (evisa) to Azerbaijan
Azerbaijani passport
Visa requirements for Azerbaijani citizens

References

External links
Republic of Azerbaijan Ministry of Foreign Affairs 
State Migration Service of the Republic of Azerbaijan 
Electronic Visa System of Azerbaijan Republic
List of Azerbaijan entry Visitor Visa Types

Azerbaijan
Foreign relations of Azerbaijan